The following highways are numbered 976:

United States